Louise Fawcett (1904−1990) was a British javelin and discus thrower.  Fawcett was educated at Hammersmith Technical School and married Leslie Leon Stenning in 1937. As a member of the British Athletic Team she participated in a number of international competitions including the Fédération Sportive Féminine Internationale second Women's World Games in Sweden (1926), in Brussels (1927), England, Prague, Berlin (1930), Birmingham, London and Barcelona (1936).

Achievements 
Fédération Sportive Féminine Internationale Women's World Games: silver at javelin throw
English Championship Javelin Record 1926 & 1931
English Championship Discus Record 1930
Middlesex County Javelin Championship 1931 - 33
Middlesex County Discus Championship 1931 - 33
British Javelin Champion 1926 - 31
British Javelin Record Holder 1926 - 30 (103 ft 7in or 49.1744m)
British Discus Champion 1930
British Discus Record Holder 1930 - 33 (106 ft 11in or 61.5188m)
Middlesex County Javelin Record Holder 1931 - 34
Middlesex County Discus Champion 1931 - 35
Middlesex County Discus Record Holder 1931 - 35
Middlesex County Shot Put Champion 1934 - 35
Second in Women's Amateur Athletic Association Indoor Shot Put Championship 1935 - 36
Southern Counties Javelin Champion 1932 - 34
Southern Counties Javelin Record Holder 1932 - 34
Southern Counties Discus Champion 1935
Southern Counties Discus Record Holder 1935
Middlesex Championships 1936; First in Javelin, First in Shot Put, Second in Discus
Southern Counties Championships 1936; Record for Javelin (103 ft 5in)
Member of the Empire Games Team, London 1934

References

British female javelin throwers
British female discus throwers
1904 births
1990 deaths
Women's World Games medalists
Athletes (track and field) at the 1934 British Empire Games
Commonwealth Games competitors for England